This list provides an index of video game titles in Banpresto's Super Robot Wars franchise, known as Super Robot Taisen in Japan. Most of the games in the series are tactical role-playing games, but several games representing other genres were also released. List is divided by video game genre and ordered by initial release date. Only the original games, Neo Super Robot Wars and Super Robot Wars Compact, had final bosses that were not directly created by Banpresto.

Tactical role-playing games

Other genres

Notes

References

External links
 Super Robot Wars Official Website
 Super Robot Wars Official 20th Anniversary Website 

Video games
Lists of video games by franchise